Larrouy Island is an island  long and  wide which rises to , (the Peak Pilot) lying in Grandidier Channel off the northwest coast of Velingrad Peninsula  north of Ferin Head, Antarctica. It was discovered by the French Antarctic Expedition, 1903–05, under Jean-Baptiste Charcot, who named it for Paul Augustin Jean Larrouy, at that time a French Minister Plenipotentiary.

See also 
List of Antarctic and sub-Antarctic islands

References

Islands of Graham Land
Graham Coast